Champasak is a small town in southern Laos, on the west bank of the Mekong River about 40 km south of Pakse, the capital of Champasak Province.

The town was once the seat of the Kingdom of Champasak, an independent Lao state which was abolished by the French in 1945 when they created the Kingdom of Laos, but the last King of Champasak had his palace in Pakse. Today the town is very small, consisting mostly of guesthouses along the riverbank, catering to tourists visiting the Wat Phu temple ruins some 10 km away.

External links

Populated places in Champasak Province
Populated places on the Mekong River